Day is an unincorporated community in Maple Ridge Township, Isanti County, Minnesota, United States.

Isanti County Roads 4 and 22 are two of the main routes in the community.  Nearby places include Dalbo, Coin, Braham, Lewis Lake, and Cranberry Wildlife Management Area.  State Highway 47 (MN 47) is nearby.

Infrastructure

Transportation
  Isanti County Road 4
  Isanti County Road 22

References

 Official State of Minnesota Highway Map – 2013/2014 edition

Day's vibrant socio-economic function began circa 1910 and was concluded by 1970.  Once a thriving micro-center of commerce, Day listed a Farmer's Co-op Creamery complete with frozen food lockers for the public's rental, a feed mill (Harry Brightbill), a hardware store (Arthur Wallen), a grocery & dry goods store (John Kranz), an egg produce, a tavern, and an automobile service and repair garage (Ruben Edblad).

Unincorporated communities in Minnesota
Unincorporated communities in Isanti County, Minnesota